The 186th (2/2nd West Riding) Brigade was a formation of the Territorial Force of the British Army. It was assigned to the 62nd (2nd West Riding) Division and served on the Western Front during the First World War.

Formation
The infantry battalions did not all serve at once, but all were assigned to the brigade during the war.
2/4th Battalion, Duke of Wellington's Regiment 	 
2/5th Battalion, Duke of Wellington's Regiment
2/6th Battalion, Duke of Wellington's Regiment
2/7th Battalion, Duke of Wellington's Regiment
2/4th Battalion, Hampshire Regiment
213th Machine Gun Company
186th Trench Mortar Battery

References

Infantry brigades of the British Army in World War I
Military units and formations in the West Riding of Yorkshire